First Lady of Ghana is the title of the wife of a sitting president of Ghana. The current first lady is Rebecca Akufo-Addo, who has held the position since 2017. They are not officially given salaries but the Ghanaian first and second lady are both given clothing allowances to serve as initiatives to be comfortable enough to advocate the country through material forms of culture.

First ladies of Ghana since independence

Demographics

See also 

 Second lady of Ghana
 President of Ghana

References

External links
 First Ladies of Ghana

Ghana

Politics of Ghana
Lists of Ghanaian women
Lists of political office-holders in Ghana